Varnas is the masculine form of a Lithuanian family name. The literal meaning is raven. Its feminine forms  are: Varnienė (married woman or widow) and Varnytė (unmarried woman). 

The surname may refer to:

 Adomas Varnas (1879–1979), Lithuanian artist
 Egidijus Varnas (born 1975), Lithuanian football (soccer) player (FK Ekranas)
 Gintaras Varnas, Lithuanian actor, theatre director, Recipient of the Lithuanian National Prize (:lt:Gintaras Varnas)
 Robertas Varnas, Lithuanian musician, chorus conductor and music educator, 2006 recipient of the Cross of the Knight of the Order for Merits to Lithuania (:lt:Robertas Varnas)

Lithuanian-language surnames